Pepiliyana West Grama Niladhari Division is a Grama Niladhari Division of the Kesbewa Divisional Secretariat  of Colombo District  of Western Province, Sri Lanka. It has Grama Niladhari Division Code 535.

Pepiliyana West is a surrounded by the Bellanvila, Kohuwala, Nedimala, Divulpitiya West and Pepiliyana East  Grama Niladhari Divisions.

Demographics

Ethnicity 

The Pepiliyana West Grama Niladhari Division has a Sinhalese majority (90.0%). In comparison, the Kesbewa Divisional Secretariat (which contains the Pepiliyana West Grama Niladhari Division) has a Sinhalese majority (97.3%)

Religion 

The Pepiliyana West Grama Niladhari Division has a Buddhist majority (81.2%). In comparison, the Kesbewa Divisional Secretariat (which contains the Pepiliyana West Grama Niladhari Division) has a Buddhist majority (93.0%)

Grama Niladhari Divisions of Kesbewa Divisional Secretariat

References